Celeste Anais Boureille (born April 20, 1994) is an American soccer player who plays as a midfielder for Division 1 Féminine club Montpellier.

Early life
Boureille is the daughter of Max Boureille, a chef, and Carol Jenkins.  She grew up in the Bay area, attending Sacred Heart Cathedral Preparatory, where she was a three-time All-West Catholic Athletic League (WCAL) selection and the 2012 WCAL Player of the Year.  She played her club soccer for Mustang Soccer Club with whom she reached the 2010 National league title.  Celeste attributes her early skill evolution to time she spent practicing skills and tricks at Panhandle Park.

University career

University of California, Berkeley
Boureille played at the University of California, Berkeley from 2012 to 2015. She appeared in 84 games, scored 16 goals and recorded 8 assists. Boureille won two Pac-12 All-Academic Honorable Mentions in 2013 and 2014. In her final season, 2015, Boureille scored 5 goals and made 2 assists, earning second-team All-Pac-12 accolades as she helped guide Cal to the NCAA Tournament.  Boureille graduated as a media studies major.

Professional career

Portland Thorns FC
Boureille joined preseason camp with Portland Thorns FC through open tryouts after going undrafted in 2016.  Following preseason training camp  she was signed to an NWSL contract on April 15, 2016.  Throughout her time at Portland, Boureille has been utilized as a right back, centre back and most recently secured her spot as a defensive midfielder.

Loan to Canberra United
In October 2016, Boureille was loaned to Canberra United for the 2016–17 W-League season.

Loan to Brisbane Roar
In October 2017, Boureille was loaned to Brisbane Roar for the 2017–18 W-League and 2018–19 W-League seasons. Boureille flourished in Australia, being named the 2017–18 Brisbane Roar Player of the Year.  She followed this with a BRFC Players' Player award for the 2018–19 season.

References

External links
Cal bio
Thorns bio

1994 births
Living people
American women's soccer players
American expatriate sportspeople in Australia
Expatriate women's soccer players in Australia
California Golden Bears women's soccer players
Portland Thorns FC players
Canberra United FC players
Brisbane Roar FC (A-League Women) players
National Women's Soccer League players
A-League Women players
Soccer players from San Francisco
Women's association football midfielders
FC Fleury 91 (women) players